is a town located in Takaichi District, Nara Prefecture, Japan.

As of March 31, 2017, the town has an estimated population of 6,964. The total area is 25.77 km².

Geography
Located in central Nara Prefecture in the Nara Basin, most of the town is flat. The majority of the land is used for agriculture, especially for grain.
 Rivers : Takatori River, Soga River, Kibi River

Surrounding municipalities
 Nara Prefecture
 Kashihara
 Gose
 Asuka
 Ōyodo
 Yoshino

Notable locations
 Takatori Castle Ruin
 Minamihokke Temple
 Kojima Temple

References

External links

 Takatori official website 

Towns in Nara Prefecture